Gyeongcheonsa Pagoda is National Treasure of Korea No. 86. It was designated by the South Korean government on December 20, 1962.

An inscription on the first story of the pagoda states that it was erected in the fourth year of King Chungmok in 1348. The pagoda was first placed at the now-lost Gyeongcheonsa Temple which sat at the foot of Mt. Buso in Gwangdeok-myeon, Gaepung-gun, Gyeonggi-do Province.  During the Japanese occupation of Korea, in 1907 the pagoda was taken to Japan. In 1918, the pagoda was returned and placed on the grounds of Gyeongbokgung Palace.  Today, the pagoda stands in one of the main halls of the National Museum of Korea.

The pagoda stands 13.5 m in height and is ten storeys tall.  However, because of the three-tiered foundation, it is a common mistake to believe that the pagoda has thirteen storeys.  Unlike most Goryeo-era pagodas, this pagoda is made from marble.  The preferred material of Korean sculptors was generally granite.  The later Joseon-era Wongaksa Pagoda is stylistically very similar and is believed to have been heavily influenced by the Gyeongcheonsa Pagoda.

Gyeongcheonsa Pagoda sits on a three-tiered foundation which projects in four directions like a cross.  The first three storeys of the pagoda share the same shape as the foundation.  Each panel of this tiered foundation is carved with Buddhas, Bodhisattvas, flowers, and arabesque patterns.

The remaining storeys are square in shape and share intricate detailing which tries to create the illusion that the marble pagoda is made from wood. Each remaining storey has railings, a hip-and-gabled roof, eaves, and carvings made to suggest that each roof is tiled.

This pagoda is very valuable because it preserves the Goryeo-era wooden architectural style that has been mostly lost. According to the South Korean Cultural Heritage Administration, this pagoda is one of the finest examples of Korean stone work and is of high artistic value.

Gallery

See also
 Wongaksa Pagoda
 National Museum of Korea
 National treasures of South Korea
 National treasures of North Korea

References

External links 
 Cultural Heritage: Gyeoncheonsa Pagoda

Korean pagodas
Stone pagodas
Korean art
National Treasures of South Korea
Pagodas in South Korea